Pratviel is a commune in the Tarn department and Occitanie region of southern France.

The name of the settlement – Prat Vièlh in Occitan – means "old meadow".

See also
Communes of the Tarn department

References

Communes of Tarn (department)